Wendell Johnson (April 16, 1906 – August 29, 1965) was an American psychologist, author and was a proponent of general semantics (or GS). He was born in Roxbury, Kansas and died in Iowa City, Iowa where most of his life's work was based. The Wendell Johnson Speech and Hearing Center, which houses the University of Iowa's speech pathology and audiology programs, is named after him. Aside from his contributions to speech–language pathology, he is known for the experiment he created with Mary Tudor nicknamed "The Monster Study" for the damage it did to its human subjects.

Early life 
Johnson began to stutter when he was around the age of five or six. When he turned twenty he began his studies at the University of Iowa in Iowa City, Iowa during 1926 to study English. He switched to psychology for his Master's degree.

The Monster Study 

Wendell Johnson developed a study with the hopes of gathering a better understanding into the depths of stuttering. During the fall of 1938, Wendell Johnson recruited Mary Tudor, one of his clinical psychology graduate students. His goal was to see if she would be able to cause children who spoke perfectly well to adopt a speech defect. She drove to the Iowa Soldiers and Sailors Orphans' home where there were more than 600 orphans as well as children whose parents were unable to care for them. Of the 600 orphans, Tudor selected twenty-two children who would go on to become her subjects in what is now known as the monster study. 

The twenty-two children were separated into four groups: Group IA, Group IB, Group IIA, and Group IIB. Group IA consisted of five children who did in fact stutter and were given the label “stutterers”, although the goal for this group of children was to remove the label placed on them. They were told they spoke normally as opposed to being ostracized into a group of individuals who spoke otherwise. Group IB consisted of five children as well who were also labelled as “stutterers”, however, unlike with Group IA these children were not told they spoke perfectly well, instead, these children were treated as such, stutterers. Group IIA consisted of six children who spoke outside the bounds of stuttering although they were labelled as “stutterers”. Unlike with the children in Group IA who did in fact stutter but were told they spoke perfectly well, the children in group IIA spoke perfectly well and were told they had an issue with stuttering. Lastly was Group IIB which consisted of six children as well who did not stutter and had no negative speech connotations placed on them. Each group of children were treated according to their labels    

This study lasted the full semester and Mary Tudor had speech sessions with each of the children in order to record their progress to add to her data. After the semester long study the results were observed. As expected, there were no major changes with the children in groups IA, IB, and IIB. However the children in group IIA had a “decrease in verbal output” as well as “they were reluctant to speak and spoke only when they were urged to” (Leonard 2019, p. 72).  

One of the many issues that arose from this study was the use of children without the use of informed consent. The major issue that arose from Johnson's experiment was the induction of stuttering in children who had not previously had issues with speech. This was in some ways an accomplishment in terms of what it was Johnson was trying to prove although it came at the expense of these children. Leonard discusses the legalities circulating around the individuals who were a part of group IIA. The six members sued the State of Iowa in 2003 and ultimately ended up being awarded $900,000 in 2007 by Iowa state in compensation.

Wendell Johnson's son, Nicholas Johnson, defended his father's study by arguing that it would pass institutional review board (IRB) approval in today's society:

In 1965, the year of Wendell Johnson's death, he was in the process of writing the Encyclopædia Britannica entry on “Speech Disorders”, defending both his work and his study when he had a heart attack. Although not fully completed, his 4,000 word essay was still published.

Stuttering contributions
Considered one of the earliest and most influential speech pathologists in the field, Johnson spent most of his life trying to find the cause and cure for stuttering – through teaching, research, scholarly and other writing, lecturing, supervision of graduate students, and persuading K-12 schools, the Veterans Administration and other institutions of the need for speech pathologists. He played a major role in the creation of the American Speech and Hearing Association. In 1930 Johnson published the book Because I Stutter, based on his master's thesis, which describes his struggles with stuttering from an autobiographical perspective.

The stutterer, if I may speak for him as a type, does not want pity any more than he wants contempt, but he does want the understanding which the normal respect of one human being for another makes possible. He is a human being, trying to make a stutterer's adaptation to a world of glib speakers.

Johnson's book People in Quandaries: The Semantics of Personal Adjustment (1946; still in print from the Institute of General Semantics) is an introduction to general semantics applied to psychotherapy. In 1956 his Your Most Enchanted Listener was published; in 1972, his Living With Change: The Semantics of Coping, a collection of selected portions of transcriptions of hundreds of his talks, organized by Dorothy Moeller, provided further general semantic insights. He also published many articles in his lifetime, in journals, including ETC: A Review of General Semantics. [1] Neil Postman acknowledges the influence of People in Quandaries in his own general semantics book Crazy Talk, Stupid Talk (1976, Delacorte, New York):

I am tempted to say that there are two kinds of people in the world – those who will learn something from this book (People in Quandaries) and those who will not. The best blessing I can give you is to wish that as you go through life you will be surrounded by the former and neglected by the latter.

Patricia Zebrowski, University of Iowa assistant professor of speech pathology and audiology, notes, "The body of data that resulted from Johnson's work on children who stutter and their parents is still the largest collection of scientific information on the subject of stuttering onset. Although new work has determined that children who stutter are doing something different in their speech production than non-stutterers, Johnson was the first to talk about the importance of a stutterer's thoughts, attitudes, beliefs, and feelings. We still don't know what causes stuttering, but the 'Iowa' way of approaching study and treatment is still heavily influenced by Johnson, but with an added emphasis on speech production."

Attacks on the 1930s master's thesis, and the journalistic labeling as a "Monster Study", due to the experimentation on orphaned children and the massive, lifelong damage it did to them, contributed to controversy. On the one hand, speech research scientists Nicoline Grinager Ambrose and Ehud Yairi are critical of the conclusions that Mary Tudor drew from her data, but believe that no harm was done to the subjects and that there was no intention to do harm. Others felt the study was unethical by today's standards but fell within the bounds of those standards in 1939.

On the other hand, Richard Schwartz concludes in Chapter 6 of the book that the study "was unfortunate in Tudor and Johnson's lack of regard for the potential harm to the children who participated and in their selection of institutionalized children simply because they were easily available. The deception and the apparent lack of debriefing were also not justifiable." Other authors concur claiming the orphan experiment was not within the ethical boundaries of acceptable research. The University of Iowa paid a settlement to some of the surviving subjects of over $900,000 in 2007.

Personal life

Johnson had a son, Nicholas Johnson (September 23, 1934) who was the former American Federal Communications Commission (FCC) commissioner from the years 1966 to 1973.

See also
Human experimentation in the United States

References

External links 
  Wendell A. L. Johnson (1906-1965) Memorial Home Page

1906 births
1965 deaths
20th-century American psychologists
General semantics
Human subject research in the United States
People from McPherson County, Kansas
University of Iowa faculty
Speech and language pathologists
Communication scholars
Stuttering